John Marcum Wells (born May 28, 1956) is an American theater, film, and television writer, director, and producer.

He is best known for his role as showrunner and executive producer of the television series ER, Third Watch, The West Wing, Southland, Shameless, Animal Kingdom, and American Woman. His company, John Wells Productions, is currently based at Warner Bros. studios in Burbank, California. Wells is also a labor leader, having served as president of the Writers Guild of America, West from 1999 to 2001 and from 2009 to 2011. Wells serves on the Motion Picture & Television Fund (MPTF) Board of Governors. In 2011, he developed the series Shameless on Showtime, which ran for eleven seasons ending in 2021.

Early life 

Wells was born in Alexandria, Virginia, the son of Marjorie Elizabeth (née Risberg) and Llewellyn Wallace Wells, Jr., an Episcopalian minister. He has English, Irish, Scottish, Swedish, and Norwegian ancestry. Wells graduated from the Carnegie Mellon School of Drama in 1979. A studio theatre at Carnegie Mellon University bears his name.  While at CMU, he was one of the earliest actors to work at City Theatre, a prominent fixture of Pittsburgh theatre.

Career

Television
Wells was a producer on the 1987 film Nice Girls Don't Explode. He joined the writing staff of the short-lived CBS drama series Shell Game in 1987. He began writing for television with an episode of CBS Summer Playhouse entitled "Roughhouse" in 1988. His company, John Wells Productions (originally John Wells & Friends), began a longstanding relationship with Warner Bros. in 1986, which was one of the most highly successful television producers in the world.

China Beach
He was hired as a producer for the second season of ABC drama series China Beach in 1988. The show was created by John Sacret Young and William Broyles, Jr. and focused on combat medics in the Vietnam War. Wells wrote five episodes for the second season and both parts of the two-part season finale "The World".

He was promoted to supervising producer for the third season of China Beach in 1989. He wrote three further episodes for that season. He returned as a co-executive producer for the fourth and final season in 1990. He was involved in writing eleven episodes in season four, including the series finale.

Wells wrote sixteen episodes of the series in total. He frequently worked with producer/director Mimi Leder on China Beach and she helmed six of the episodes he wrote. China Beach also marked the start of Wells's working relationship with casting director John Frank Levey, editors Randy Jon Morgan and Jacque Toberen and directors Rod Holcomb and Fred Gerber.

TV movies
Wells worked on two television films in 1992 Angel Street and The Nightman. Wells co-wrote and was the co-executive producer of The Nightman. The film was directed by Charles Haid and is about a young man moving into a hotel run by a mother and daughter. Wells helped to adapt the teleplay from the radio drama by Lucille Fletcher.

Angel Street was written and executive produced by Wells. It reunited him with several China Beach crew members including director Rod Holcomb, editor Jacque Toberen, and casting director John Frank Levey. The telefilm was followed by a series on which Wells again worked as an executive producer. Wells also wrote the screenplay for Entertaining Angels: The Dorothy Day Story, the project was produced in 1996 and starred Martin Sheen and Moira Kelly.

ER
In 1994 Wells was hired as an executive producer for the pilot of NBC medical drama ER. The show was created by novelist Michael Crichton. The pilot episode was directed by frequent Wells collaborator Rod Holcomb and John Frank Levey was involved as a casting director.  The pilot was edited by frequent China Beach editor Randy Jon Morgan.

Wells became the show runner and head writer for the ongoing series that followed the pilot. He was credited as an executive producer for all fifteen seasons of the series and served as the show runner for the first six seasons. He hired China Beach writer Lydia Woodward as a supervising producer and writer. China Beach director Mimi Leder also became a supervising producer and regular director. ER marked the start of Wells longstanding collaboration with producer/director Christopher Chulack and music composer Martin Davich.

Wells wrote five episodes of the first season and he and the producers were nominated for an Emmy Award for Outstanding Drama Series at the 1995 ceremony for their work on the first season. The season was nominated for 23 Emmy Awards and won 8 in total. Wells and Michael Crichton won a Producers Guild of America Award at the 1994 ceremony. Wells and Crichton also received an honorable mention at the Wise Owl Awards in the Television and Theatrical Film Fiction category.

Wells remained show runner for the second season in 1995. He hired his China Beach colleague Carol Flint as a co-executive producer for the second season. Wells wrote four more episodes for the second season and he and the producers won the Emmy Award for Outstanding Drama Series at the 1996 ceremony for their work on the second season. Wells was also nominated for a Humanitas Prize (in the 60-minute category) and an Emmy Award for Outstanding Writing for a Drama Series for the episode "The Healers".

Wells remained the head writer for the third season in 1996 and wrote three episodes. Wells and the producers were nominated for the Emmy Award for Outstanding Drama Series at the 1997 ceremony for their work on the third season. Wells was again nominated for the Emmy Award for Outstanding Writing for a Drama Series for the episode "Faith".

He continued in the same capacity for the fourth season in 1997 and wrote two further episodes. Wells also made his television directing debut with his screenplay "Carter's Choice". Wells and the producers were nominated for the Emmy Award for Outstanding Drama Series at the 1998 ceremony for their work on the fourth season.

Wells returned as head writer for the fifth season in 1998. He wrote both parts of the two-part episode "The Storm" and also directed the first part. Wells and the producers were once again nominated for the Emmy Award for Outstanding Drama Series at the 1999 ceremony for their work on the fifth season. Wells stood down as show runner after the fifth season but remained an executive producer and major creative force behind the series. In the 1999–2000 TV season his company Wells productions launched two new series The West Wing and Third Watch.

Woodward took over as show runner for the sixth season but Wells wrote "The Peace of Wild Things" and wrote and directed "Such Sweet Sorrow". Wells and the producers were once again nominated for the Emmy Award for Outstanding Drama Series at the 2000 ceremony for their work on the sixth season but lost out to Wells's other show The West Wing. Wells was nominated for the Emmy Award for Outstanding Directing for a Drama Series for his work on "Such Sweet Sorrow". He was also nominated for the 2000 PGA Vision Award for his work on ER, Third Watch and The West Wing.

Wells continued to write for the seventh season and contributed to two episodes. Wells was nominated for a Humanitas Prize for his work on "A Walk in the Woods". Wells and the producers were once again nominated for the Emmy Award for Outstanding Drama Series at the 2001 ceremony for their work on the seventh season and were again beaten by Wells's other series The West Wing.

For the eighth season Wells wrote two episodes, including the penultimate episode "On the Beach" which featured the departure of longterm cast member Anthony Edwards. Wells was nominated for the Emmy Award for Outstanding Writing for a Drama Series for his work on "On the Beach" at the 2002 ceremony. He was also nominated for a further Humanitas Prize and a Writers Guild of America (WGA) Award at the 2003 ceremony for the episode.

For the ninth season Wells wrote the final episode "Kisangani".

He returned in fall 2003 to write three episodes. Wells was again nominated for a Humanitas Prize, this time for his work on "Makemba".

He continued to handle Carter's storylines for the eleventh season and wrote the penultimate episode "Carter est Amoureux" and directed the finale "The Show Must Go On" which marked the departure of Noah Wyle (who played Carter) from the starring cast.

For the twelfth season Wells co-wrote the premiere episode. Wells served solely as an executive producer and director on the thirteenth and fourteenth seasons, directing one episode in each season.

He returned as a writer for the fifteenth and final season and wrote and directed the episode "Old Times" which featured several past starring cast members including Noah Wyle, George Clooney, Julianna Margulies, and Eriq La Salle.

When ER ended in 2009, Wells had written 31 episodes, and directed 7.

Trinity
Wells Productions also produced Trinity, a short lived NBC family drama focusing on an Irish-American family in Hell's Kitchen. Wells served as an executive producer and writer for the series but it was cancelled after only nine episodes due to low ratings. The series won an Emmy Award for composer Martin Davich's music. Davich also worked on ER. The show starred John Spencer, Tate Donovan and Kim Raver. It also featured Third Watch actors Bobby Cannavale, Skipp Sudduth, and Molly Price.

Third Watch
Wells co-created Third Watch with ex-Chicago police officer Edward Allen Bernero. Wells worked as show runner on Third Watch for its first three seasons and served as an executive producer throughout its six-season run. The series focused on emergency services workers across a single shift in New York. The first season began in 1999. Wells and Bernero co-wrote the pilot episode "Welcome to Camelot".
 
Wells also wrote the first-season episodes "Sunny, Like Sunshine", "This Band of Brothers", "Spring Forward, Fall Back", and the first-season finale "Young Men and Fire".

Wells wrote four second-season episodes the premiere entitled "The Lost", "Faith", "Requiem for a Bantamweight", and the finale "...and Zeus Wept". Wells directed the second-season episode "True Love".

Wells wrote a further four episodes for the third season in 2001 – "September Tenth", "After Time", "Adam 55-3", and "Two Hundred and Thirty-Three Days". Bernero took over as show runner after the third season and Wells remained attached as an executive producer until Third Watch ended in 2005 but did not write any more episodes.

The West Wing
Wells took over as show runner of The West Wing in 2003 for the fifth season. He ran the show for three seasons until its conclusion in 2006.

Southland
During the 2008 to 2009 television season Wells developed Southland for NBC. The series was created by Ann Biderman. It follows detectives and patrol officers in the titular area of Los Angeles. Wells returned as an executive producer for the second season in fall 2009 and co-wrote the season premiere "Phase Three" with Biderman. NBC canceled the series while the second season was in production but the episodes were picked up and aired by TNT.

TNT renewed the series for a third season and Wells remained an executive producer and writer. He again co-wrote the season premiere "Let It Snow" with Biderman. He also wrote the teleplay for the season finale "Graduation Day" from a story by his ex-assistant Heather Zuhlke.

Animal Kingdom
Wells was a producer, writer and director on the TNT crime drama Animal Kingdom from 2016 to 2022. He received a writing credit on five episodes and directed 10 episodes, including the pilot and the series finale.

Shameless
In 2009, Wells began work on an American adaptation of the British series Shameless. Originally commissioned by HBO, the project moved to competing network Showtime, where it debuted in January 2011.

Starring William H. Macy as an alcoholic single father of six children, Shameless was the best performing first-year drama in Showtime's history. Shameless has run for 11 seasons.

Film

The Company Men
Wells made his directorial debut with the film drama The Company Men, starring Ben Affleck.  The film was scheduled for release in the fall of 2010 but premiered earlier at the Sundance film festival.  After the Sundance screening, The Hollywood Reporter said, "Wells has made, for his first film, a tough movie and certainly not a commercial one. This displays the kind of guts he always brought to his television work, which one can only hope continues on in other future film projects."

August: Osage County

His second film, August: Osage County (2013), which he directed from a script by Tracy Letts, stars Meryl Streep, Julia Roberts, and Ewan McGregor. The Weinstein Company released the film in December 2013. The film was nominated for two Academy Awards® including Best Performance by an Actress in a Leading Role (Streep) and Best Performance by an Actress in a Supporting Role (Roberts).

Love and Mercy

He next produced Love and Mercy the critically acclaimed biopic about The Beach Boys, starring Paul Dano, John Cusack, Paul Giamatti and Elizabeth Banks. The film originally premiered at the Toronto International Film Festival in September 2014.

Burnt
Wells directed the cooking drama film Burnt, previously titled Chef and Adam Jones, in which Bradley Cooper starred as a Paris chef named Adam Jones. Sienna Miller co-starred, along with Omar Sy, Emma Thompson, Daniel Brühl, Alicia Vikander, and Lily James.

Filmography

Film

Executive producer-only

Television 
The numbers in directing and writing credits refer to the number of episodes.

Notes

Awards and nominations

John Wells Productions won a Peabody Award in 1999 and 2000 for The West Wing and again in 2001 for Third Watch'''s '"In Their Own Words," which told the stories of real-life responders to the 9/11 attack on New York City.

John Wells has been nominated for twenty-five Emmy Awards and received six wins including Outstanding Drama Series in 1996 for ER,  Outstanding Drama Series in 2000, 2001, 2002 and 2003 for The West Wing, and Outstanding Special Class Program in 2002 for The West Wing Documentary Special.

Wells has been nominated for six Producers Guild Awards and won three awards for his work on The West Wing and ER''. He was honored with the Vision Award in 2000 as well as the Lifetime Achievement Award in Television in 2005.

In addition, Wells has been nominated for seven Writers Guild Awards and won the Directors Guild Diversity Award in 1997.

On May 18, 2014, Wells received an honorary Doctor of Fine Arts degree from Carnegie Mellon University, where he graduated from in 1979.

References

External links

1956 births
American film producers
American trade union leaders
American male screenwriters
American television directors
American television writers
Carnegie Mellon University College of Fine Arts alumni
Film directors from California
Film directors from Virginia
Living people
Businesspeople from Alexandria, Virginia
People from Greater Los Angeles
Primetime Emmy Award winners
Showrunners
Writers from Alexandria, Virginia
American people of English descent
American people of Irish descent
American people of Norwegian descent
American people of Scottish descent
American people of Swedish descent
American male television writers
Screenwriters from Virginia
Television producers from Virginia